The 2nd Bangsamoro Transition Authority (BTA) Parliament, is the second interim Bangsamoro Parliament, the legislature of the transitional regional government of Bangsamoro.

It is composed of members of the Bangsamoro Transition Authority which had a new set of members on August 12, 2022, who are appointed by President Bongbong Marcos.

It succeeded the 1st BTA Parliament of 2019 to 2022 and had its inaugural session on September 15, 2022. The first regular session opened on September 20, 2022.

Leadership
For the second parliament, the position of majority and minority leaders were discontinued. Sha Elijah Dumama-Alba was initially named as majority leader with no minority leader named. Dumama-Alba was later redesignated as floor leader.

Composition

The interim Bangsamoro Parliament's mandate was supposed to end on June 30, 2022, as per the Bangsamoro Organic Law, but this was extended to 2025 by law passed by President Rodrigo Duterte whose presidency ended on the same day the interim parliament is supposed to be dissolved.

Duterte's successor President Bongbong Marcos appointed a new set of members for the interim parliament. 49 were reappointed while are 31 new members. The composition of 41 MILF nominees and 39 government nominees were still retained. The MILF nominees include people associated with the MNLF — eight from the Sema-Jikiri faction and seven from the Nur Misuari's faction. Misuari's group became part of the parliament for the first time.

The BTA under President Marcos would be informally referred to as "BTA2" while the BTA under Duterte became retroactively known as "BTA1".

An inaugural session with the new set of members appointed by Marcos was held on September 15, 2022. A new set of officials was elected as well, including Pangalian Balindong who was again elected as speaker. Additional officers were elected and the minority and majority leader position were abolished on the first regular session on September 20, 2022.

Graphical representation
This is the graphical representation of the 2nd Bangsamoro Transition Authority showing its make up (as of September 15, 2022):

Note this is not the official seating plan of the Bangsamoro Parliament.

List of MPs

Former MPs 
These includes members who were part of the 1st parliament who are not reappointed to the 2nd parliament. No elections were held for the 2nd parliament.

Changes

References

 
Bangsamoro Transition Authority